Totte Mannes (born 1933 in Kajaani, Finland) is a visual artist whose oil paintings are on display in many museums and collections. She lives in Madrid. She has had nearly 90 sole exhibitions and over 80 collective exhibitions in 17 countries.

Recent work
Totte Mannes was invited in May, 2007, to exhibit her paintings from the past twenty years in two exhibitions in Seinäjoki, Finland: one at the Municipal Art Hall and the other at the Varikko Gallery. 

July 2007: Totte's works were displayed at the Galleria Uusitalo in Helsinki. (www.galleriauusitalo.fi).

Totte worked on a new series of oil paintings called "Dismantled Sculptures". Totte describes this new series as "de-structivist", in contrast to "con-structivist". The first of the 'Dismantled Sculptures' was shown at the Finnish Institute in Madrid 14 February - 13 March, and then at the Uusitalo Gallery in Helsinki from 2 July 2008. The series (about 40 paintings) toured Mexican art museums in 2008–2009, including San Pedro Museum, Puebla, Tlaxcala Art Museum and Querétaro Municipal Museum, Gumbostrand konst o. Form, Finland (2013-2014) Art Madrid Fair 2014.

References

External links
 Mannes, Totte

1933 births
Living people
People from Kajaani
Contemporary painters
20th-century Finnish women artists
Finnish expatriates in Spain
21st-century Finnish women artists
Finnish women painters